Larissa Freitas Cieslak (born October 26, 1987) is a Brazilian competitive swimmer.

In 2006 South American Games, she won a bronze medal in the 200-metre individual medley.

At 20 years old, in 2007 Pan American Games in Rio de Janeiro, she went to the 400-metre individual medley final, finishing in 8th place.

In 2010 South American Games, she won a silver medal in the 400-metre individual medley.

She was at the 2010 Pan Pacific Swimming Championships in Irvine, where she finished 15th in the 400-metre individual medley, and 26th in the 200-metre individual medley.

Integrating Brazil national delegation that disputed the 2011 Pan American Games in Guadalajara, Mexico, she won the silver medal in 4×200-metre freestyle by participating at heats. She was also ranked 12th in the 400-metre individual medley and 13th in the 200-metre individual medley.

References

1987 births
Living people
Sportspeople from Federal District (Brazil)
Brazilian female freestyle swimmers
Brazilian female medley swimmers
Swimmers at the 2007 Pan American Games
Swimmers at the 2011 Pan American Games
Pan American Games silver medalists for Brazil
Pan American Games medalists in swimming
South American Games silver medalists for Brazil
South American Games bronze medalists for Brazil
South American Games medalists in swimming
Competitors at the 2006 South American Games
Competitors at the 2010 South American Games
Medalists at the 2011 Pan American Games
20th-century Brazilian women
21st-century Brazilian women